Menashe is a 2017 Yiddish-language American drama film directed by Joshua Z. Weinstein. It premiered at the Sundance Film Festival in January 2017, where it was acquired by A24 for U.S. distribution. The film was released in the United States on July 28, 2017.

Plot
Menashe, a recently widowed Hasidic Jewish man, tries to regain custody of his ten-year-old son Rieven (Ruben Niborski). Rieven is living with his aunt and uncle (Eizik, Yoel Weisshaus) per a ruling by the Rabbi (Meyer Schwartz) that Menashe must first remarry to provide a proper home for his son. Menashe's first marriage was unhappy, and he is reluctant to wed again. He works as a clerk in a grocery store with a difficult manager, and has a hard time earning enough money for himself. He doesn't wear the traditional black coat and top hat in public, though his son tells him he would look nice in one. Eizik, his successful brother-in-law, looks down on him. They argue in front of the Rabbi, who lets Rieven stay with Menashe for a week, until the upcoming memorial service for his wife, but reiterates the requirement for a two-parent home. Eizik wants the memorial meal in his finer home, but Menashe insists on having it in his shabby apartment. Getting a "bachelor-proof" recipe for kugel from a neighbor, Menashe puts the pan in the oven before going to the cemetery for the service. He and the participants, including the Rabbi, return to an apartment full of smoke. Eizik criticizes the burnt kugel, but the Rabbi praises it and insists the uncle eat a piece. Menashe begs Eizik to let Rieven live with him, but is told he must first find a wife. Menashe says he will see the matchmaker again. He goes to the ritual bath (mikvah), and dons a coat and top hat.

Production 

The plot of Menashe is loosely based on Lustig's life. In an interview with the Los Angeles Times he said that "unlike Menashe in the film, I'm not a schlimazel by nature. Maybe just a schlimazel by situation."

Customs and religious practices depicted include:

 a Lag BaOmer bonfire
 studying texts in the beth midrash 
 a Farbrengen (celebratory gathering)
 Negel vasser - morning ritual, bedside hand washing.
 wearing the tallit katan undergarment
 wearing the rekel overcoat
 Mikvah, immersion in a ritual bath

The film was shot over the course of two years in Borough Park, Brooklyn, home to one of the largest Orthodox Jewish populations outside of Israel, a decision that Weinstein has said was motivated by a desire for authenticity. In an interview before the film's Sundance premiere, he said, "When I thought about making a film in Borough Park, in Yiddish, with real Hasidic Jews, to me, it was just as interesting as any documentary I ever made."

Cast 
 Menashe Lustig as Menashe
 Ruben Niborski as Rieven
 Yoel Weisshaus as Eizik
 Meyer Schwartz as Rabbi
 Hershy Fishman as Zalman

Release 
The film premiered on January 23, 2017, at the Sundance Film Festival. A trailer was released on April 19, featuring the song "Pashut" by Zusha. The film was released only on Blu-ray in the United States by A24, rather than Lions Gate, who usually handles their home entertainment distribution.

Critical reception 
On Rotten Tomatoes, the film has an approval rating of 96% based on 118 reviews, with an average rating of 7.50/10. The website's critical consensus reads, "Menashe offers an intriguing look at a culture whose unfamiliarity to many viewers will be rendered irrelevant by the story's universally affecting themes and thoughtful approach." On Metacritic the film has a score of 81 out of 100, based on 27 critics, indicating "universal acclaim".

In a glowing review, Clint Davis of WCPO-TV said it "might as well be a foreign film" for most American viewers, due to its setting and heavy use of Yiddish. He wrote that, despite this, it was "as universal as movies come." He praised Lustig's and Niborski's performances as charming.

Accolades

References

External links 
 
 

2017 films
2017 independent films
A24 (company) films
Vertigo Films films
American drama films
American independent films
Films shot in New York City
Films set in Brooklyn
Films about Jews and Judaism
Hasidic Judaism in the United States
Jews and Judaism in Brooklyn
Orthodox Jews and Judaism in New York City
Hasidic Judaism in fiction
Yiddish-language films
Films about Orthodox and Hasidic Jews
2010s American films